Gymnographa is a genus of lichenized fungi in the family Graphidaceae.

References

External links
Gymnographa at Index Fungorum

Ostropales
Lichen genera
Ostropales genera
Taxa named by Johannes Müller Argoviensis